This is a list of adult fiction books that topped The New York Times Fiction Best Seller list in 1934. When the list began in 1931 through 1941 it only reflected sales in the New York City area.

The two most popular books that year were So Red the Rose, by Stark Young, which held on top of the list for 17 weeks, and Lamb in His Bosom by Caroline Miller, which was on top of the list for 8 weeks.

See also

 1934 in literature
 Lists of The New York Times Fiction Best Sellers
 Publishers Weekly list of bestselling novels in the United States in the 1930s

References

1934
.
1934 in the United States